A navel piercing (also referred to as a belly button piercing) is a type of piercing located through the skin of the navel. It is most commonly located on the upper fold of skin, but can also be effected underneath or around the edges of the navel. It may heal quickly and with no irritations, like an ear piercing, or may heal more like a surface piercing with the associated extended healing time. Healing usually takes around 6–12 months, but varies by person due to differences in physiology.
Navel piercings reject less frequently than most other surface piercings, but the rejection rate is nonetheless higher than non-surface piercings. A properly effected navel piercing involves piercing the skin surrounding the navel with the initial wound inside of the navel canal. This can be done at any angle where there is a clear flap of skin, but the most prevalent form of navel piercing is through the upper rim of the navel.

History and culture

The history of navel piercing has been misrepresented, as many of the myths promulgated by Doug Malloy in the pamphlet Body & Genital Piercing in Brief continue to be reprinted. For instance, according to Malloy's colleague Jim Ward, Malloy alleged that navel piercing was popular among ancient Egyptian aristocrats and was depicted in Egyptian statuary, an allegation that is widely repeated. In spite of its currency, other sources deny that the historical record supports the allegation.

The navel piercing is one of the most prevalent body piercings today. Pop culture has played a large role in the promotion of this piercing. The navel piercing first hit the mainstream when model Christy Turlington revealed her navel piercing at a fashion show in London in 1993. The popularization of the piercing, however, is accredited to the 1993 Aerosmith music video for their song "Cryin'," wherein Alicia Silverstone has her navel pierced by body piercer Paul King.

According to a 2005 survey of 10,503 people in England, the navel was the top body piercing site at 33% of people.

Jewelry

The jewelry used here is commonly called as "belly rings". Belly rings are a midriff-revealing version of earrings.

Navel jewelry has become more extensive in recent years. Many new designs, such as the ancient Bali jewelry designs, have been added to modern navel cultures. Curved barbells remain the most commonly used jewelry, but captive bead rings, and other rings can be used as well. Due to the amount of movement in this area, and the common swelling, they are not recommended. The world's first huggy was designed and patented by TummyToys belly rings. Vogue published an article in 2015 about the circular captive bead belly rings and TummyToys snap lock clasps becoming the latest trend for navel piercings. Most kinds of ring or bar jewelry can be worn in a navel piercing. Navels are most often pierced with a 14g curved barbell, which is recommended to be worn until the piercing has completely healed, the healing time is typically anywhere between 6 – 12 months. A wide variety of embellished jewelry is available for navels - simple curved barbells, captives, TummyToys huggies, flexible PTFE and deluxe long length styles with dangling pendants. Currently, real diamond and solid gold belly rings are also available in a wide range of styles. Most kinds of ring or bar jewelry can be worn in a navel piercing, both for top and bottom piercings.

There has been a special standard established for navel barbells (also called "bananabells" or "bananabars", a reference to their curved shape). The standard barbell is 1.6 mm (1/16") thick and 9.5 mm (3/8") or 11.1 mm (7/16") long and is most commonly referred to as a 14-gauge post. The silver caps on the barbell post usually measure 5 mm in diameter for the upper and 8 mm in diameter for the lower.

Although navel bananabells are different from full rings, such as captive bead rings, which can also be worn in navel piercings, online body jewelry retailers and wholesalers tend to refer to these barbells as "belly rings".

A new version of navel jewelry is on the market for those without pierced navels, which is based on the idea of clip-on earrings.

Risks
Navel piercings can be one of the slowest piercings to heal, with sources reporting a range of six months to two full years.

Navel piercings carry several risks, including:
Infection: A new piercing may take up to 6–12 months before it can be taken out, during which time sweat, bacteria, and friction may lead to infection. A piercer cannot properly tell you whether a piercing is infected, but can give advice and recommend medical advice when needed. Infected navel piercings can result in sepsis and possibly death.
Scarring: Skin tissue rarely heals to match the surrounding tissue. It heals in varying thickness, and size. It is likely that any piercing worn for a significant time (months to years) will leave a scar if removed.
Rejection: Rejection is when the body pushes out a piercing in order for the wound to properly heal. This can happen even if the wearer takes very good care of the navel piercing. There is no way to stop rejection, as it is just the body's natural healing process. It can be prevented, though, by maintaining proper aftercare, preventing it from getting pulled at or tugged on, and being pierced in the correct spot by a reputable piercer. If rejection occurs, the jewelry should be removed as soon as feasible to minimize the scarring.
Migration: Migration can happen many ways, and for many different reasons. It may be that the amount of movement in the area pushed the piercing to a spot where it would be easier to heal, trauma from pulling or tugging on the piercing could have added excess scar tissue, or it was improperly pierced, making the body push it to a more comfortable spot. 
Death: An estimated 9 women have died in the United States between 2006 and 2019 from infections caused by navel piercing, according to the Office of National Statistics Records.

References

External links

The Association of Professional Piercers aftercare instructions.

Body piercing
Surface piercings
Navel
1990s fashion
2000s fashion
2010s fashion